There were five main arenas where Australian Great War Poetry was written in the period of 1914 to 1939: the Home Front, Gallipoli, The Middle East, The Western Front and England. These arenas were to form important segregations of poetic attitude and interest specific to the war mood at the time. Australian poets, just like their British counterparts, could be humorous, melancholy, angry or just longing for home. Many Australians, for example, wrote about the Australian flora, and how they missed it.

Many of these poets served in more than one campaign, while others only served in one, either joining up after Gallipoli, or being invalided back home or killed in action. A small listing of Australian Great War Poets can be seen below.

Soldiers
Leon Gellert, Frank Westbrook, Oliver Hogue, Tom Skeyhill, Frederic Manning, Edwin Gerard, Geoffrey Wall, Walter James Redfern Turner, William McDonald, Ion Idriess, Andrew Barton Paterson and many others.

Nurses
Christine Erica Strom, Alice Ross-King and Emily 'Beryl' Henson.

Civilian men
Archibald T. Strong, Arthur Henry Adams, Bernard Patrick O’Dowd, C.J. Dennis, Christopher Brennan, Edward Dyson, Henry Lawson, John Le Gay Brereton, Leonard Nelson and many more.

Civilian women
Agnes Rose-Soley, Agnes Littlejohn, Alice Gore-Jones, Capel Boake, Dorothea McKellar, Dorothy McCrae, Ella McFadyen, Esther Nea-Smith, Grace Ethel Martyr, Joan Torrance, Madoline 'Nina' Murdoch, Margery Ruth Betts, Marion Knowles, Mary Gilmore, May Kidson, Philadelphia N. Robertson and many others.

Foreign pro-Australia
Arthur St. John Adcock - Lance Corporal Cobber, C. Fox Smith, Edgar Wallace, Ethel Campbell, Henry Newbolt, Jessie Pope and Sylvia Hobday.

Prediction poets
Henry Lawson and William Wentworth to name only two. There are several.

References

External links
AGWP Canon & Register Australian Great War poetry website

Australian poetry
War poets
Australian World War I poets
Australian literature